This is a list of notable people affiliated with Corpus Christi College, University of Oxford, England. It includes former students, current and former academics and fellows. This list of alumni consists almost entirely of men, because women were not allowed to study at the college from its foundation in 1517 until 1979.

Notable former students

Academics
 Max Beloff, Baron Beloff – historian and Conservative peer
 Isaiah Berlin – social and political theorist, philosopher and historian of ideas
 G. E. Berrios – Professor of Psychiatry, Cambridge University
 Charles Otto Blagden – linguist
 William Buckland – geologist and palaeontologist
 John Y. Campbell – economist
 Edmund Kerchever Chambers – literary scholar
 Catherine Conybeare – Professor of Classics and author
 Sir Steven Cowley FRS – theoretical physicist (and former President of Corpus)
 Thomas James Dunbabin – classicist scholar and archaeologist
 Mark Edwards – scholar of Patristics, the New Testament, early Church history and Later Roman philosophy
 Richard Ellis – astronomer and cosmologist
 Henry Furneaux – classical scholar specialising in Tacitus
 Herbert Paul Grice – philosopher of language
 Francesca Happé – professor of cognitive neuroscience at the Institute of Psychiatry, King's College London
 William V. Harris – William R. Shepherd Professor of History at Columbia University 
 Charles Henderson – historian of Cornwall
 Richard Hooker – 16th-century theologian
 Jonathan A. Jones –  Professor of Physics, Oxford University
 Clyde Kluckhohn – American Rhodes Scholar, anthropologist
 Patrick McTaggart-Cowan – Canadian meteorologist and the first president of Simon Fraser University
 Roger Moorey – antiquarian and former Keeper of Antiquities, Ashmolean Museum
 Judith Mossman – Professor of Classics at the University of Nottingham
 Thomas Nagel – American philosopher whose main areas of interest are philosophy of mind, political philosophy and ethics
 Henry Nettleship – classical scholar
 G. E. L. Owen – classicist and philosopher
 J. I. Packer – British-born Canadian Christian theologian 
 Edward Pococke – Orientalist and biblical scholar
 Robert Proctor – Bibliographer
 John Rainolds – academic and churchman
 Boris Rankov – professor of Roman history at Royal Holloway, University of London
 Basil William Robinson – Asian art scholar and author
 John Ruskin – art critic, watercolourist, prominent social thinker and philanthropist
 Gail Trimble – senior faculty member in Classics at Trinity College, Oxford
 Tsatsu Tsikata – former University of Ghana law lecturer and head of Ghana National Petroleum Company
 Juan Luis Vives – scholar and humanist
 Patrick Maxwell – Regius Professor of Physic at the University of Cambridge Science
 Sir Bernard Williams – moral philosopher, former Provost of King's College, Cambridge

Educators
 Thomas Arnold – educator and historian, headmaster of Rugby School from 1828 to 1841
 Sir John Francis Lockwood Master of Birkbeck College, London, 1951–1965; Vice-Chancellor of the University of London, 1955-1958
 John Rosewell – Headmaster of Eton College

Musicians, artists and writers

 Al Alvarez – poet, novelist, essayist and critic
 Lucy Atkins – journalist and author
 Gerard Baker – former editor-in-chief, Wall Street Journal 
 Roy Beddington – painter, illustrator, novelist, journalist, and poet 
 Alex Bellos – journalist and author
 Patrick Bishop – journalist and author
 Ian Bostridge – tenor singer
 Robert Bridges – British poet, and poet laureate from 1913 to 1930.
 Geoff Dyer – writer
 Richard Edwardes – writer and composer
 Toby Harnden – journalist and author
 Alfred William Hunt – painter
 Charles H. M. Kerr – artist
 MC Lars – musician
 Robert Liddell – literary critic, biographer, novelist, travel writer and poet
 Camilla Long – The Sunday Times journalist
 Henry Newbolt – poet, novelist and historian
George Sandys - poet and adventurer
C. P. Scott – journalist, publisher and politician
 Vikram Seth – Indian novelist and poet
 Nicholas Udall – playwright, cleric, and schoolmaster
 Jane Wilson-Howarth – author and physician

Politicians, civil servants and lawyers 

 Ben Cannon – American teacher and politician from Oregon
 Chen Show Mao – Singaporean Rhodes Scholar, corporate lawyer and Singapore Member of Parliament
 Gerard Clauson –  British civil servant, businessman, and orientalist
 David Curry – British Conservative Party politician. He was the Member of Parliament (MP) for Skipton and Ripon from 1987 to 2010
Stephen Doughty – British Labour Party politician. Member of Parliament (MP) for Cardiff South and Penarth from 2012.
 David Hartley – signatory to the Treaty of Paris
 Stephen Lovegrove – civil servant and the Permanent Secretary of the Ministry of Defence.
 David Miliband – Secretary of State for Foreign Affairs (2007—2010) and Labour leadership candidate (September 2010)
 Ed Miliband – Secretary of State for Energy and Climate Change (2008—2010) and Labour leader
 David Normington – Permanent Secretary at the Home Office
 Sir Christopher Nugee QC – High Court judge
 James Oglethorpe – British general, Member of Parliament, philanthropist, and founder of the colony of Georgia.
 Richard Pate – landowner and Member of Parliament for Gloucester in the Parliament of 1559 and 1563-1567
 Sir Edwyn Sandys – politician and founder member of the Virginia Company
 William Waldegrave, Baron Waldegrave of North Hill – Conservative politician who served in the Cabinet (1990–1997)
 John Harvey (Count Binface – a candidate for Uxbridge and South Ruislip in the 2019 United Kingdom general election against incumbent prime minister Boris Johnson.

Clergy

 Derek Browning – Moderator of the General Assembly of the Church of Scotland (2017–18)
 Francis Chavasse - Anglican Bishop of Liverpool, founder of St Peter's College, Oxford, father of Noel Godfrey Chavasse VC & Bar, MC.
 John Keble – churchman and poet,  gave his name to Keble College, Oxford
 Henry Phillpotts – Anglican Bishop of Exeter from 1830 to 1869
 Reginald Pole – cardinal, last Catholic Archbishop of Canterbury
 John Penrose – clergyman and theological writer

Broadcasters
 Michael Cockerell – political commentator and broadcaster
 Kenneth Kendall – BBC newscaster

Other people
 Flight Lieutenant Dominic Bruce OBE MC AFM KSG, a British Royal Air Force officer, known as the "Medium Sized Man"
 Sam Kay – caused the college's University Challenge 2009 team to be disqualified as champions
 Hector Sants – Chief Executive Officer of the Financial Services Authority (2007—2012)
 Michael Spencer – businessman; the chief executive of ICAP plc
 Nicholas Wadham – benefactor of Wadham College, Oxford.

Fellows and academics
 Michael Brock – historian, Fellow
 William Cole – clergyman, President of Corpus Christi College, Oxford and Dean of Lincoln
 Sunanda K. Datta-Ray – Indian newspaperman and journalist, supernumerary fellow
 Sir Kenneth Dover – classical scholar and academic, President of Corpus Christi College (1981–2005)
 Henry Furneaux – classical scholar specialising in Tacitus
 Andrew Glyn – Fellow and Tutor in Economics
 Sir Brian Harrison – editor, Oxford Dictionary of National Biography
 Peter Hore – Fellow and Tutor in Chemistry
 Thomas Hornsby – astronomer and mathematician, Fellow 1760
 Judith Maltby – Chaplain and Fellow, church historian 
 Jim Mauldon – Fellow, Tutor in Mathematics, Dean
 G. E. L. Owen – classicist and philosopher
 Edward Pococke – orientalist and biblical scholar, Fellow (1682)
 J. O. Urmson – philosopher and classicist, Fellow
 Stephen Harrison (classicist) – Fellow
 John Watts (historian) – Fellow
Mark Wrathall (philosopher) – Fellow

Honorary Fellows
The following have been Honorary Fellows:
 Al Alvarez
 Gerard Baker
 Mohamed Bin Issa Al Jaber
 Ian Bostridge
 Sir Anthony Bottoms
 Kenneth Cameron, Baron Cameron of Lochbroom
 John Y. Campbell
 Michael Cockerell
 John M. Cooper
 Yang Jingnian

See also
Former students of Corpus Christi College, Oxford

References

Corpus Christi College, Oxford